Marcus 'Jonathan' Clift (born 25 August 1964) is a male retired British rower. Clift competed in the men's coxless four event at the 1984 Summer Olympics.

His brother is Olympian Adam Clift.

References

External links
 

1964 births
Living people
British male rowers
Olympic rowers of Great Britain
Rowers at the 1984 Summer Olympics
Place of birth missing (living people)